Vincenzo "Vince" Grella (born 5 October 1979) is an Australian former footballer who played as a midfielder. Born in Dandenong to Italian immigrants, Antonio and Maria, Grella began his senior career in Australia before moving to Italy, where he spent over ten years, playing for Empoli, Ternana, Parma and Torino. He moved to Blackburn Rovers of the Premier League in 2008 where he spent four seasons, before returning to Australia in 2012 to play for Melbourne Heart.

He retired from professional football in January 2013, after a long-standing struggle with injuries. Grella represented the Australian national team on 46 occasions, and played at the 2006 and 2010 World Cups. His 2010 FIFA World Cup profile describes him as a possessing the "ability to mop up loose balls and halt opposition counter-attacks."

Club career

Italy
He had a ten-year stint in Italy's professional leagues after beginning his career in the NSL. He has been a regular for Australia since 2003, playing in his customary defensive midfield position, and was involved in both the 2006 World Cup and the 2007 Asian Cup.
Grella's friendship with Australian teammate Mark Bresciano is well known. Grella has described Bresciano as "even more than a brother"; they played together at the AIS, Carlton and Empoli, and were reunited in 2004 when Grella joined Parma, before Bresciano moved on to Palermo in 2006. Aged 19, Grella made his debut in Serie A with Empoli, in a match against Juventus at the Stadio Delle Alpi, where his first job was to mark Zinedine Zidane. (Empoli held Juventus to a 0–0 draw). Grella built up his reputation in Italy during his time with Empoli, to overcome initial doubts about his suitability to Serie A and earn the respect of the Italian media, coaches and fellow players. Grella was widely linked with a move to A.C. Milan in 2003, although the proposed transfer never eventuated, and he moved to Parma a year later. While at Parma, both Grella and Bresciano were excused from the 2005 Confederations Cup by the then-Australian manager Frank Farina to allow the pair to take part in a relegation playoff between Parma and Bologna–which Parma won, to avoid relegation.

Grella was named as captain of Parma for the 2006–07 season, and played a key role helping the team avoid relegation from Serie A for a second consecutive season. On 20 June 2007, Grella signed a three-year contract with Torino, one of several new signings made by The Bull. The move to Torino was a free transfer due to the expiry of his contract with Parma. During his one season in Turin, he was a regular member of the side, although his season was interrupted by injury on several occasions. He scored one league goal for Torino, a powerful volley from the edge of the penalty area, which cannoned in off the far post to draw level with Fiorentina. The goal was a candidate for goal of the month for January in Serie A. It was only the sixth league-goal of his career.  From July 2022 he assumes the position of vice president and CEO of the Catania SSD owned by Ross Pelligra Australian of Sicilian origins

Blackburn Rovers
On 26 August 2008, Grella joined English then Premier League outfit Blackburn Rovers on a four-year deal, for an undisclosed fee, rumoured to be around £4m (with the initial fee later revealed as €4.2m), having previously been linked to fellow Premiership club Fulham. He joined fellow Australian Brett Emerton at the club. He made his first appearance for the club in a 4–1 loss to West Ham United at Upton Park, where he played the first 45 minutes, picking up a yellow card and providing an assist with a header for the only Blackburn goal, before being substituted at half-time for Keith Andrews. A calf injury kept him out of the side for a month following his debut, and he returned to the side in a 1–1 draw with Middlesbrough at Ewood Park, playing the full game in the centre of midfield. This was his home debut, and he was later named man-of-the-match for his performance.

The following 3 years he spent at the club were a frustrating time for Grella, and Blackburn Rovers fans, with injuries disrupting his stay at Rovers. A succession of knee, groin and calf problems would ultimately rule him out for vast majority of his contract. After the 2010–11 season, Blackburn Rovers revealed their desire to transfer Grella. However, with his history of injuries, no offers were made, and he left Blackburn Rovers upon the expiry of his contract at the end of the 2011/12 Barclays Premier League season, a season in which he only made 2 appearances. Over the last 2 years of his contract, Grella was only able to make a total of 9 appearances due to injuries.

Melbourne City
On 16 October 2012, he signed with Australian A-League club Melbourne City on a one-year deal. Previously, Grella stated he announced his intention to return to Italy next season, rather go back to his home country. But in the unexpected event, Grella says former national teammate and now manager of Melbourne City, John Aloisi convinced Grella to play football in Australia. Two months after the move, continuously having injuries, Aloisi revealed he's making a comeback from injury and just returned to training.

Vince Grella made his A-League debut for the Melbourne City on Australia Day, 26 January 2013 against the Western Sydney Wanderers at the Parramatta Stadium as a 68th minute replacement for Jonatan Germano. He officially announced his retirement two days later due to a torn calf that he picked up in his one match for Melbourne City. In an interview with the Australian FourFourTwo Magazine, Grella spoke out his retirement and said:

International career
Grella was a regular member of the Socceroos; he represented the Australian Under-23s at the 2000 Summer Olympics and received his first senior cap when he came on as a second-half substitute in the international friendly against England in 2003, which Australia won 3–1 at West Ham's Upton Park stadium. In November 2005, Grella played in both legs of the World Cup play-off against Uruguay, where Australia qualified for the 2006 World Cup for the first time in 32 years. At the World Cup, Grella's displays in the heart of Australia's midfield saw him named in a preliminary squad for FIFA's team of the tournament, the only Australian to make this list.

On 13 November 2006, Grella was selected as captain for an international friendly in London against Ghana, making him the 51st player to captain the Australia football team. On 21 July 2007 in Hanoi, Vietnam, Grella was sent off in the 76th minute of Australia's 2007 Asian Cup quarter-final against Japan. Leaping for a header, Grella's forearm connected with Naohiro Takahara's head, who had come from behind Grella, sending the latter to the ground. The game was 1–1 at the time and remained that way until the end of extra time, with Japan eliminating Australia from the tournament in a penalty shoot-out. He has currently amassed 46 caps for Australia since making his debut back in February 2003.

Post-playing career
In July 2022, Grella moved back to Italy, after being named vice-president and CEO of Sicilian Serie D club Catania following the club's rebirth under an Australian ownership.

Career statistics

Club

International
Source:

Personal life
Grella and his wife, Barbara, have twin daughters, Victoria and Sophia, born in 2002. Grella first met Barbara while she was working in a shoe store in Empoli, Italy, which Grella frequently visited to buy shoes following their first meeting.

References

External links
 

 Blackburn profile
 OzFootball profile
 Article on SMH
 Article on The Age
 Migration Heritage Centre feature on Grella family

1979 births
Living people
Soccer players from Melbourne
Australian people of Italian descent
Sportspeople of Italian descent
Association football midfielders
Australian soccer players
Premier League players
Serie A players
Serie B players
Springvale White Eagles FC players
Blackburn Rovers F.C. players
Carlton S.C. players
Empoli F.C. players
Parma Calcio 1913 players
Ternana Calcio players
Torino F.C. players
National Soccer League (Australia) players
Australia international soccer players
Australian expatriate soccer players
Expatriate footballers in England
Expatriate footballers in Italy
Australian expatriate sportspeople in England
Australian expatriate sportspeople in Italy
Olympic soccer players of Australia
Footballers at the 2000 Summer Olympics
2004 OFC Nations Cup players
2006 FIFA World Cup players
2007 AFC Asian Cup players
2010 FIFA World Cup players
Australian Institute of Sport soccer players
A-League Men players
Melbourne City FC players
People from Dandenong, Victoria